Hatsukope is a village in Aflao, Volta Region of Ghana. The town is known for the St. Paul’s Senior High School.  The school is a second cycle institution.

References

Populated places in the Volta Region